Argiolestidae is a family of flat-wing damselflies in the order Odonata. There are at least 20 genera and more than 160 described species in Argiolestidae.

Genera

 Allolestes Selys, 1869
 Archiargiolestes Kennedy, 1925
 Argiolestes Selys, 1862
 Austroargiolestes Kennedy, 1925
 Caledargiolestes Kennedy, 1925
 Caledopteryx Kennedy, 1925
 Celebargiolestes Kennedy, 1925
 Eoargiolestes Kalkman & Theischinger, 2013
 Griseargiolestes Theischinger, 1998
 Luzonargiolestes Kalkman & Theischinger, 2013
 Metagrion Calvert, 1913
 Miniargiolestes Theischinger, 1998
 Nesolestes Selys, 1891
 Neurolestes Selys, 1882
 Podolestes Selys, 1862
 Podopteryx Selys, 1871
 Pyrrhargiolestes Kalkman & Theischinger, 2013
 Solomonargiolestes Kalkman & Theischinger, 2013
 Trineuragrion Ris, 1915
 Wahnesia Förster, 1900

References

Further reading

 
 

Odonata families